Allison-Robinson House, also known as the John C. Robinson House, is a historic home located at Spencer, Owen County, Indiana.  It was built between about 1855 and 1860, and is a two-story, "L"-plan, frame vernacular Greek Revival style I-house.  It has a central passage plan and medium pitched roof. The front facade features a central two-story, one-bay entrance portico with fluted Doric order columns. Also on the property is a contributing section of retaining wall.

It was listed on the National Register of Historic Places in 1993.

References

Houses on the National Register of Historic Places in Indiana
Greek Revival houses in Indiana
Houses completed in 1860
Buildings and structures in Owen County, Indiana
National Register of Historic Places in Owen County, Indiana